Chewbacca, nicknamed "Chewie", is a fictional character in the Star Wars franchise. He is a Wookiee, a tall, hirsute, bipedal, intelligent species originating from the fictional planet of Kashyyyk. Chewbacca is the loyal friend and first mate of Han Solo, and serves as co-pilot on Solo's spaceship, the Millennium Falcon; together they help the Rebel Alliance defeat the Galactic Empire and restore freedom to the galaxy.

In the original trilogy, Chewbacca is portrayed by Peter Mayhew. Mayhew shares the role with his body double, Joonas Suotamo, in the first episode of the sequel trilogy, Star Wars: The Force Awakens. Suotamo took over the role in the next episode, The Last Jedi, and reprised it in the anthology film Solo: A Star Wars Story and the final sequel trilogy film, The Rise of Skywalker. The character has also appeared in numerous works within the Expanded Universe, consisting of television series, books, comics, and video games.

Character
Chewbacca, a 200-year-old Wookiee, becomes a young Han Solo's companion after they both escape Imperial captivity on Mimban. After a series of adventures on Vandor and Kessel, Chewbacca embarks on the smuggling trade, serving as Han's co-pilot on the Millennium Falcon for the rest of Han's life.

His weapon of choice is the Wookiee bowcaster (a crossbow-shaped directed-energy weapon). Chewbacca speaks only in his native language, Shyriiwook (which sounds like animal sound growls); he is able to understand English, but is physically unable to speak it. Han Solo, likewise, also understands Shyriiwook perfectly.

Chewbacca was named one of the "greatest sidekicks" in film history by Entertainment Weekly.

In other countries
In France, in the original Star Wars film, his name was changed to "Chiktabba" and his nickname to "Chiko", because the English name was similar to "chewing tobacco", which in French is "tabac à mâcher" or "tabac à chiquer", similar to "Chiquetabac". In the other films, his name was "Chewbacca".

In the Italian-language editions, Chewbacca is named "Chewbecca" and is nicknamed "Chewbe".

Creation
Chewbacca's creation as a "gentle, hairy, non-English-speaking co-pilot" was inspired by George Lucas seeing his own dog sitting up on the passenger seat of his car. It is said that Chewbacca's name is derived from собака (sobaka), the Russian word for dog.

In his first six screen appearances, Chewbacca was played by Peter Mayhew, who was chosen for his height of 7'3" (2.2 m).  Five similar costumes were created for Mayhew: in the three original films and a holiday special, the suits were made of yak hair and mohair. In Revenge of the Sith (2005), the suit was made of more comfortable materials, though Mayhew's filming only lasted a day. Only Mayhew's blue eyes could be seen in his costume, but fans easily recognize him by his gestures, and his co-workers claimed the ability to tell when a stand-in was taking his place. For The Force Awakens, the role was also shared by Joonas Suotamo, who subsequently portrayed the character in later screen appearances after Mayhew's retirement.

Chewbacca's voice was created by the original films' sound designer, Ben Burtt, from recordings of walruses, lions, camels, bears, rabbits, tigers, and badgers in Burtt's personal menagerie. The individual recordings were mixed at different ratios for Chewbacca's different utterances. One of the most prominent elements in the voice was a black bear named Tarik, from Happy Hollow Zoo in San Jose, California.

The original costume was created by Stuart Freeborn and his wife Kay Freeborn, who hand-knitted the torso section. During preproduction of The Force Awakens, Creature Effects Supervisor Neal Scanlan commented that the original suit was far more sophisticated than they had originally realized, leading him to entirely scrap their first attempt at making the new suit, go back and study Freeborn's work in order to better appreciate how it worked, and attempt to emulate it.

Appearances

Skywalker saga

Original trilogy

First appearing in Star Wars (1977), Chewbacca and Han Solo accept a charter to take Luke Skywalker, Obi-Wan Kenobi, and droids C-3PO and R2-D2 to the planet Alderaan aboard their ship, the Millennium Falcon. When they find the planet destroyed by the Death Star, the two smugglers help their passengers rescue Princess Leia and take her to the Rebel base on Yavin 4. In the film's climactic battle scene, Chewbacca and Han save Luke from being killed by Darth Vader and give him time to destroy the Death Star. In the film's final scene, Princess Leia acknowledges Chewbacca alongside Luke and Han.

In The Empire Strikes Back (1980), set three years later, Chewbacca tries to leave the Rebellion along with Han in order to repay Jabba, but is drawn back into the war when the Empire invaded the Rebel base on Hoth. Chewbacca and the other protagonists seek refuge on Cloud City with Han's old friend Lando Calrissian, unaware that Lando has betrayed them to the Empire. Chewbacca finds a dismantled C-3PO, blasted by an Imperial stormtrooper, in a junk pile, and rescues him from being melted down. He tries to repair him, to no avail, shortly before Vader takes Chewbacca and the others prisoner. Before Han is frozen in carbonite, he asks Chewbacca to look after Leia for him. When Lando is able to save Leia and Chewbacca from being taken to Vader's ship, he uncuffs the Wookiee, who upon release starts strangling him for selling them out. When Lando explains that they still have a chance to save Han, Leia has Chewbacca stop choking him. Even though they are unsuccessful at saving the frozen Han, they make it back to the Falcon with R2-D2. Chewbacca carries C-3PO on his back throughout their escape to the Falcon. When Leia hears Luke's cry for help, she has Chewbacca turn the ship around to rescue him. In the film's final scene, Chewbacca joins the others in preparing to rescue Han from Jabba.

In Return of the Jedi (1983), Chewbacca pretends to be the prisoner of a bounty hunter named Boushh, who is actually Leia in disguise. Chewbacca helps Leia, Luke and the others rescue Han and escape. Later, he goes with the others to the forest moon of Endor on a mission to destroy the second Death Star's shield generator, and is instrumental in the mission's success by commandeering an AT-ST walker. At the end of the film, Chewbacca joins the other Rebels in celebrating the destruction of the Death Star and the downfall of the Empire.

Prequel trilogy
In the 2005 prequel film Star Wars: Episode III – Revenge of the Sith, Chewbacca and Tarfful fight in the Clone Wars when their planet, Kashyyyk, is invaded by the Separatist Alliance. They also help Yoda escape the clone troopers that had been ordered to kill him. Chewbacca is not identified until Yoda says goodbye to him at the end of a scene.

Sequel trilogy
On April 7, 2014, it was confirmed that Mayhew would reprise his role as Chewbacca in Star Wars: The Force Awakens.

In the film, set 30 years after Return of the Jedi, he and Han are piloting a cargo vessel and find the Millennium Falcon, which had been stolen from them. Chewbacca and Han help the rogue First Order stormtrooper Finn, the scavenger Rey and the droid BB-8 escape from a gang of mercenaries on board the Falcon. They then fly to Maz Kanata's castle so that Maz can help them get BB-8 to the Resistance. Before Chewbacca and the others can get Maz's help, however, the First Order attacks the castle and captures Rey while Chewbacca, Finn, and Han are saved by X-wing pilots led by Poe Dameron. Without Rey, they fly to a Resistance base, where Chewbacca and Han reunite with Leia, C-3PO, and R2-D2. They also soon reunite with Rey, who escaped from the First Order. Chewbacca helps in the fight between the Resistance and the First Order. When Han is killed by his son Kylo Ren during the battle, an enraged Chewbacca shoots Ren in the side, and sets off explosives that allow Poe and other X-wing pilots to destroy Starkiller Base, the First Order's planet-converted superweapon. Chewbacca shortly thereafter rescues Rey and Finn from the wilderness of Starkiller Base following their duel with Ren. As Starkiller Base blows up, Chewbacca escapes in the Falcon with Finn and Rey, and later, along with R2-D2, helps Rey find Luke on the planet Ahch-To.

Chewbacca returns in Star Wars: The Last Jedi, which takes place immediately after The Force Awakens. He attempts to convince Luke to train Rey as a Jedi and defeat the First Order, though Luke refuses. Chewbacca is seen in and around the Falcon throughout the Ahch-To scenes, where he develops a relationship with the planet's indigenous seabirds known as Porgs. Later on, Chewbacca and Rey set off on the Falcon to Supreme Leader Snoke's Mega-class Star Dreadnought Supremacy, during Rey's attempt to turn Kylo Ren back to the light. Chewbacca later helps the Resistance fight the First Order's army; he pilots the Falcon as part of a plan to distract the First Order TIE fighters. After Rey and Luke defeat the First Order, Chewbacca is seen along with the rest of the Resistance as the Falcon flies away from the battle.

Chewbacca appears in The Rise of Skywalker, now played solely by Suotamo. Chewbacca accompanies Rey, Finn, Poe, and C-3PO to the planet Passana, where they search for a clue to the location of a Sith wayfinder. With the help of Lando Calrissian, they locate the clue - a dagger with Sith inscriptions - but are quickly found by the First Order. As Rey confronts Kylo Ren, Chewbacca, who has the dagger, is captured by the Knights of Ren and taken aboard a transport to the Resurgent-class Star Destroyer Steadfast. Believing him to be on a different transport, Rey and Ren both use the Force to pull it down, with Rey accidentally using Force lightning to destroy the ship; Rey is deeply shaken when she believes she has killed Chewbacca, and his "death" motivates the others to continue the mission in his memory. Chewbacca is in reality taken to the command ship, where he is questioned about his friends' whereabouts; Rey senses his presence when the ship arrives on Kijimi, and Finn and Poe stow aboard the ship to rescue him. Later on, after Rey abandons them on Kef-Bir, they return to the Resistance base, where Chewbacca is distraught to learn of Leia's death. He joins the Resistance in defeating and destroying the Sith Eternal forces. He is last seen receiving Han's old medal (given to him in A New Hope) from Maz Kanata. The medal is a token of gratitude for his long-term service to the rebellion as well as a memento through which to remember his fallen old friends Han, Luke and Leia.

Anthology films

Solo: A Star Wars Story 

Chewbacca appears in the 2018 anthology film Solo: A Star Wars Story, which details his first meeting with Han. He first appears as a "beast" captured by Imperials on the planet Mimban, where he is held captive in a small pit. Han, considered a "troublemaker" by the other Imperials, is thrown into the pit and chained to Chewbacca to be eaten by the Wookiee. Chewbacca emerges and attacks Han, but stops when Han reveals he can speak Shyriiwook. They form an instant bond, and escape their captors. They then decide to join the thief Tobias Beckett and his crew, who rescue them. Chewbacca later helps Han and Beckett's crew on their failed mission to steal coaxium for the Crimson Dawn crime syndicate. Later, on Kessel, during an effort to retrieve more coaxium to make up for the amount lost during the previous mission, Chewbacca spots several other Wookiees being held as slaves, and manages to free them. However, while making a choice whether to go with them or with Han, Chewbacca decides to assist Han instead, and helps him throughout the rest of the mission. During the Kessel Run, in which Han decides to pilot the Millennium Falcon through a cloudy maelstrom to evade an Imperial blockade, Chewbacca reveals his piloting skills to Han. Near the end of the movie, Beckett, now revealed to be a traitor, captures Chewbacca. After Han saves Chewbacca and kills Beckett, he wins the Falcon from Lando. Han and Chewbacca then set off on more adventures in the Falcon.

Television

The Clone Wars 
In the season 3 finale of Star Wars: The Clone Wars, Chewbacca is captured by Trandoshan hunters, but is freed by Ahsoka Tano and agrees to help her and two younglings escape. He builds a transmitter out of parts from the damaged Trandoshan ship, but it doesn't work. Later, he and Ahsoka attack the Trandoshan fortress before they are found and assisted by other Wookiees, led by Tarfful.

Literature
In 2015, Marvel Comics published a five-issue miniseries titled Chewbacca written by Gerry Duggan and art by Phil Noto. The comic is part of the canon developed subsequent to Disney's acquisition of Lucasfilm in 2012, and the end of Dark Horse Comics' publication of Star Wars comics.

Legends

In April 2014, most of the licensed Star Wars novels and comics produced since the originating 1977 film Star Wars were rebranded by Lucasfilm as Star Wars Legends and declared non-canon to the franchise.

Television
The 1978 television program Star Wars Holiday Special introduced Chewbacca's family, namely his wife Mallatobuck, son Lumpawarrump, and father Attichitcuk, who is also the Chief of the Kaapauku Tribe. The special features a frame story in which Chewbacca and Han travel to Kashyyyk to celebrate Life Day with Chewbacca's family, while trying to prevent Darth Vader from spoiling the holiday for them. Both Life Day itself and all of his family would end become part of the Disney canon.

Literature
Chewbacca appears in the Han Solo Adventures trilogy of books written by Brian Daley, including Han Solo at Stars' End, Han Solo's Revenge and Han Solo and the Lost Legacy, originally published between 1979 and 1980.

Chewbacca's family is prominently featured in several Legends books, most notably The Wookiee Storybook, The Black Fleet Crisis trilogy by Michael P. Kube-McDowell, and The Hutt Gambit and Rebel Dawn by A. C. Crispin. The latter also introduces other family members, including a sister named Kallabow and cousins named Dryanta and Jowdrrl, as well as the matriarch, Ellen.

In the novel Dark Lord: The Rise of Darth Vader, set just after the events in Star Wars Episode III: Revenge of the Sith, Chewbacca is forced to leave Kashyyyk after he narrowly escapes a major Imperial attack on the planet. Darth Vader and Emperor Palpatine enslave most of Kashyyyk's population in order to build the Death Star. To escape, Chewbacca joins a group of smugglers who are friendly to the Jedi.

The novel The Hutt Gambit explains how Chewbacca and Han first meet. Han, a lieutenant in the Imperial Navy, finds him unconscious aboard a slave ship. Han's commanding officer orders him to skin Chewbacca, but Han refuses and rescues the helpless prisoner. Upon regaining consciousness, Chewbacca swears a "life-debt" to Han, and the two become business partners and best friends.

In the novel Heirs of the Force, part of the Young Jedi Knights series, Chewbacca has a nephew, Kallabow's son named Lowbacca who goes to the Jedi Academy.

In the 1999 novel Vector Prime by R. A. Salvatore, the first in the New Jedi Order series, Chewbacca sacrifices his life to save Han's son Anakin from a collision between the planet Sernpidal and one of its moons. Lumpawarrump and Lowbacca offer to assume Chewbacca's life debt to Han.

Chewbacca appears in the third book of the Origami Yoda series, The Secret of the Fortune Wookiee (in origami form) and in some of the subsequent books of the series.

Lucasfilm followed Vector Prime with a four-issue comic book titled Star Wars: Chewbacca, in which C-3PO and R2-D2 travel the galaxy to collect the stories of beings who knew or met the Wookiee.

Video games
In the fighting game Star Wars: Masters of Teräs Käsi, Chewbacca is a playable character.

In Star Wars Jedi Knight: Jedi Academy, Chewbacca appears briefly at the Mos Eisley spaceport as an NPC, assisting Jaden Korr in disabling the tractor beams holding both the Millennium Falcon and the Raven's Claw captive.

In LucasArts' game Kinect Star Wars, the player acts as gunner on a spacecraft piloted by a young Chewbacca.

In Star Wars Battlefront II, Star Wars Battlefront: Renegade Squadron and Star Wars Battlefront: Elite Squadron, Chewbacca is a playable hero on the rebels side. He is also playable the 2015 reboot of the series, through the Death Star DLC, and its 2017 sequel.

Chewbacca is a playable character in the Lego-themed video games Lego Star Wars: The Video Game, Lego Star Wars II: The Original Trilogy, Lego Star Wars III: The Clone Wars, Lego Star Wars: The Force Awakens and Lego Star Wars: The Skywalker Saga.

Reception
IGN has been fond of the character, choosing the character as the 9th top Star Wars character, listing his relationship with Han Solo as one of their top 10 movie bromances, claiming him as one of the characters they would like to see in The Clone Wars, and choosing him as one of the characters they would like to see in Star Wars: The Force Unleashed and (along with Han) its sequel. UGO Networks listed the character as "one of the most bad-ass archers in popular culture."

In contrast, Roger Ebert in his 1997 review of the Special Edition re-release of The Empire Strikes Back declared that the character gave the worst performance of the film: "This character was thrown into the first film as window dressing, was never thought through, and as a result has been saddled with one facial expression and one mournful yelp. Much more could have been done. How can you be a space pilot and not be able to communicate in any meaningful way? Does Han Solo really understand Chew's monotonous noises? Do they have long chats sometimes?"

Chewbacca is one of the few fictional characters to receive a Lifetime Achievement Award at the 1997 MTV Movie Awards.

Cultural impact

Chewbacca defense
The Chewbacca defense, a term derived from the "Chef Aid" episode of South Park, is a legal strategy focused on confusing the jury rather than refuting an argument.

Chewbacca Mask Lady
"Chewbacca Mask Lady" refers to a viral 2016 video of a woman happily wearing a Chewbacca mask.

References

Footnotes

Citations

External links

 
 
 Chewbacca on IMDb

Characters created by George Lucas
Fictional aerospace engineers
Fictional characters with superhuman strength
Fictional space pilots
Film characters introduced in 1977
Fictional first officers
Fictional generals
Fictional extraterrestrial humanoids
Fictional mechanics
Fictional mercenaries
Fictional military personnel in films
Fictional prison escapees
Fictional revolutionaries
Fictional slaves
Fictional smugglers
Fictional war veterans
Film sidekicks
Male characters in film
Fictional soldiers
Space pirates
Star Wars Anthology characters
Star Wars Skywalker Saga characters
Star Wars video game characters